The Hill States of India were princely states lying in the northern border regions of the British Indian Empire.

History 

During the colonial Raj period, two groups of princely states in direct relations with the Province of British Punjab became part of the British Indian Empire later than most of the former Mughal Empire, in the context of two wars and an uprising.

For its princely rulers the informal term Hill Rajas has been coined. It does not apply to other native hill country princes such as the Rawat of Rajgarh.
 
After the independence and split-up of British India, the Hill States acceded to the new Dominion of India and were later divided between India's constituent states of Punjab (proper), Haryana and Himachal Pradesh.

Simla Hills

28 princely states (including feudatory princes and zaildars) in the promontories of the western Himalaya were named after Shimla as the Simla Hill States. These states were  mainly ruled by Hindu Rajputs.

The direct tributaries of Bashahr were: 
 Thakur of Khaneti 
 Thakur of Delath
Initially both Khaneti and Delath were feudatories of Kumharsain.

The other princely states, all far smaller, included a few with petty dependencies of their own, and were further south, on the left bank of the Sutlej:
 
 the Rana (also styled as Rana Saheb) of Kumharsain. Tributaries of Kumharsain before 1815 were:
 Rana of Balsan
 Thakur of Madhan
 Thakur of Bharauli
 Thakur of Beja State
 Rana of Bhaji/Bhajji
 Prince of Bhagat
 Raja of Bilaspur (formerly Kahlur/Kehloor), entitled to an 11-guns salute
 Rana of Darkoti
 Rana (Shri) of  Dhami
 Raja (formerly Rana) of Jubbal, witj two tributaries:
 Thakur (sahib) of Dhadi State, initially tributary to Tharoch, then to Bashahr and finally in 1896 to Jubbal.
 (title?) Rawin = Rawingarh
 Raja (formerly Rana) of Keonthal, where the feudal pyramid included five zaildars (jagirdars collecting a special tax) :
 a Jagirdar Gundh
 a Jagirdar Madhan = Kiari
 Rana Sahib of Koti (since 1815) 
 Thakur Saheb (also styled as Rana) of Ratesh (popularly known as Kot, 'fortress') 
 Rana of Theog
 Thakur of Kunihar
 Rana of Kuthar
 Thakur of Mahlog
 Rana of Mangal
 Raja of Nalagarh
 Thakur (or Rai Mian) of Sangri State
 Thakur (originally titled Rana up to the occupation by the Gurkhas; Thakurs from 1815 to 1929) of Tharoch = Tiroch 

NB - For various of the entities above, the authentic title of the chieftain is missing.  While some of the lowest-ranking may have had  none, for the princes that can merely be due to insufficient sources available.The princely states of the Simla Hills all ultimately became part of the modern Indian state of Himachal Pradesh.

 States of the Punjab Hills 
Some nearby Hindu and Sikh states include :
 Maharaja of Kangra, 
 Raja (Saheb) of Chamba, entitled to an 11 gun salute
 Raja of Mandi, 
 Raja of Suket, 
 Raja of Siba, no salute, as Siba was not fully part of the British Indian Empire, only Siba Jagir (Jagir of Mian Devi Singh) up to Kotla

 References 

 Sources and external links 
 Indian Princely States website
 Punjab State Gazetteer [then Punjab was much larger], vol. VIII, Gazetteer of the Simla Hill States 1910''
 Himachal Pradesh State's official website and various links therefrom (click on map or names) to official sites of the state's districts

Princely states of Punjab
Princely states of Himachal Pradesh
History of Himachal Pradesh
History of Punjab
History of Punjab, India
History of Haryana